

570001–570100 

|-bgcolor=#f2f2f2
| colspan=4 align=center | 
|}

570101–570200 

|-bgcolor=#f2f2f2
| colspan=4 align=center | 
|}

570201–570300 

|-bgcolor=#f2f2f2
| colspan=4 align=center | 
|}

570301–570400 

|-bgcolor=#f2f2f2
| colspan=4 align=center | 
|}

570401–570500 

|-bgcolor=#f2f2f2
| colspan=4 align=center | 
|}

570501–570600 

|-bgcolor=#f2f2f2
| colspan=4 align=center | 
|}

570601–570700 

|-bgcolor=#f2f2f2
| colspan=4 align=center | 
|}

570701–570800 

|-bgcolor=#f2f2f2
| colspan=4 align=center | 
|}

570801–570900 

|-id=814
| 570814 Nauru || 2006 WY || Nauru, an island country and microstate in Oceania, in the Central Pacific, formerly known as Pleasant Island. With an area of only , Nauru is the third-smallest country in the world behind Vatican City and Monaco. || 
|}

570901–571000 

|-bgcolor=#f2f2f2
| colspan=4 align=center | 
|}

References 

570001-571000